Dyckia maritima is a species of flowering plant in the Bromeliaceae family. This species is endemic to Brazil. This is an ornamental bromeliad.

References

maritima
Endemic flora of Brazil
Flora of the Atlantic Forest
Plants described in 1889
Taxa named by John Gilbert Baker